SketchUp is a suite of subscription products that include SketchUp Pro Desktop, a 3D modeling Computer-Aided Design (CAD) program for a broad range of drawing and design applications — including architectural, interior design, industrial and product design, landscape architecture, civil and mechanical engineering, theater, film and video game development.

Owned by Trimble Inc., the program is currently available as a web-based application, SketchUp Free, and three paid subscriptions, SketchUp Shop, SketchUp Pro, and SketchUp Studio, each with increasing functionality.

The program includes drawing layout functionality, surface rendering in different "styles", and enables placement of its models within Google Earth.

History

@Last Software 

SketchUp was developed by startup company @Last Software of Boulder, Colorado, co-founded in 1999 by Brad Schell and Joe Esch. SketchUp was created in August 2000 as a 3D content creation tool and was envisioned as a software program for design professionals. The program won a Community Choice Award at its first tradeshow in 2000. The first macOS release of SketchUp won a "Best of Show" at Macworld in 2002.

Google 

Google acquired @Last Software on March 14, 2006, attracted by @Last Software's work developing a plugin for Google Earth. On January 9, 2007, Google announced Google SketchUp 6, a free downloadable version of SketchUp, including integrated tools for uploading content to Google Earth and to the Google 3D Warehouse.

Google SketchUp Pro 6 introduced a beta version of Google SketchUp LayOut which includes 2D vector tools and page layout tools allowing presentations to be produced without the need for a separate presentation program.

On November 17, 2008, SketchUp 7 was released with integration of SketchUp's Component Browser with Google 3D Warehouse, LayOut 2 and dynamic components that respond to scaling.

On September 1, 2010, SketchUp 8 was released with model geolocation with Google Maps and Building Maker integration. Mac OS X Tiger was no longer supported. SketchUp version 8 use under Wine has been rated "Gold". Geolocation information is always stored in the KMZ file. The building designs themselves are saved in SKP.

Trimble 
Trimble Navigation (now Trimble Inc.) acquired SketchUp from Google on June 1, 2012 for an undisclosed sum. In 2013, SketchUp 2013 was released. A new site was provided, Extension Warehouse, hosting plugins and extensions for SketchUp.

Subscriptions 

SketchUp comes in three subscription options:

Studio 

Everything in the pro plus professional rendering via Chaos' V-Ray for SketchUp and point cloud import and management via Trimble's Scan Essentials.

Pro 

SketchUp Pro subscription includes the eponymous desktop 3D modeler, plus importers and exporters to common 2D and 3D formats, access to SketchUp's repository of pre-built 3D models (3D Warehouse), access to its extension library (Extension Warehouse), access to LayOut (2D documentation software) and Style Builder (create custom edge styles for SketchUp models). SketchUp Pro 2016 has native integration with Trimble Connect, treat 3D Warehouse models as references, a rebuilt Generate Report and now LayOut offers web-friendly reference objects as well as a new LayOut API.

SketchUp Pro licensing is dual-platform and works on Windows and Mac machines.

Go 
Go, formally known as Shop, is a SketchUp offering that includes the following: web and mobile modelers, SketchUp for Web and SketchUp for iPad; Trimble Connect Business, a cloud collaboration tool for viewing, sharing, and accessing project information from anywhere; and access to SketchUp's model library, 3D Warehouse. 

SketchUp Go is aimed at design and construction professionals who are stakeholders in the design, review, and presentation process, as well as for DIY designers. It has a feature set designed to meet the specific needs of users on the go. For example, users can model and mark up 3D models digitally using Apple Pencil and touch. They can take iPad to construction project sites and coordinate in 3D. [Reference: https://www.sketchup.com/plans-and-pricing/sketchup-go] SketchUp Go does not include the desktop modeler, a downloadable application that can be used offline. Currently, only Pro and Studio plans feature this modeler.

Free 
In November 2017, SketchUp Free was released as a web-based application which replaces SketchUp Make. Drawings can be saved to the cloud, saved locally as a native SKP file, or exported as an STL file. Compared to Make, SketchUp Free does not support extensions, creation and editing of materials. The product is not for commercial use.

License 
On June 4, 2020, Trimble announced that SketchUp would transition to a subscription business model. After November 4, 2020, SketchUp no longer sells perpetual licenses and maintenance & support plans.

3D Warehouse 

3D Warehouse is an open library in which SketchUp users may upload and download 3D models to share. The models can be downloaded right into the program without anything having to be saved onto your computer's storage. File sizes of the models can be up to 50 MB. Anyone can make, modify and re-upload content to and from the 3D warehouse free of charge. All the models in 3D Warehouse are free, so anyone can download files for use in SketchUp or even other software such as AutoCAD, Revit and ArchiCAD - all of which have apps allowing the retrieval of models from 3D Warehouse. Since 2014 Trimble has launched a new version of 3D Warehouse where companies may have an official page with their own 3D catalog of products. Trimble is currently investing in creating 3D developer partners in order to have more professionally modeled products available in 3D Warehouse. According to the Trimble, 3D Warehouse is the most popular 3D content site on the web. SketchUp designers may visit 3D Warehouse to discover new products or for inspiration when designing their own.

Patents 
SketchUp holds U.S. Patent 6,628,279, granted in September 2003, on its "Push/Pull" technology.

Software extensions 
SketchUp 4 and later support software extensions written in the Ruby programming language, which add specialized functionality. Many such extensions are available to others on the Trimble Extension Warehouse and many other 3rd party websites as well. SketchUp has a Ruby console, an environment which allows experimentation with Ruby.

SketchUp Free, the web-based version, does not support extensions which severely limits the functionality of the tool.

File formats 

SketchUp supports its own  file extension.

It supports the following 3D modeling formats: .3DS, .DAE, .DEM, .DDF, .DXF, .DWG, .IFC (.IFCZIP), .KMZ, .STL, PDF (Mac Only).
SketchUp Export: SKP, 3DS, DAE, DWG, DXF, FBX, IFC, OBJ, KMZ, STL, WRL, XSI
SketchUp Export images: JPG, PNG, TIF, PDF (Mac Only ), EPS

Layout formats 
LayOut Import: SKP, BMP, GIF, JPEG, JPG, PNG, TIF, TIFF, RTF, TXT, DWG, DXF, CSV, TSV, XLSX.

LayOut Export: PNG, JPG, PDF, DWG, DXF.

References

External links 

 

2000 establishments in the United States
2000 software
3D graphics software
Computer-aided design software for Windows
Software companies established in 2000
Google acquisitions
Google software
MacOS computer-aided design software